Hero Hitler in Love is a 2011 Indian Punjabi-language romantic and action film directed by Sukhwant Dhadda and written by Babbu Maan. The Maan Films production stars Babbu Maan, Mouni Roy and Bhagwant Maan in lead roles. It is loosely based on the folktale of Mirza Sahiban and released on 18 November 2011.

Synopsis

Hero Hitler in Love revolves around the life of a man called Hitler who lives in his village, Ishkapur, in India. Hitler is a man with unique and different thoughts, who loves his fellow villagers and helps soul-mates come together. Hitler falls in love with Sahiban, who lives in Pakistan and decides to bring her to his village. Hitler believes in solving problems by talking about them, but when something crosses the line, he loses it. The film also revolves around car racing. Hitler loves to race, but when he is set up to fail in the Asian Car Racing competition he decides to take revenge. The story relates how Hitler takes his revenge and fights for Sahiban, in the process helping to calm the tension between the competing nations of India and Pakistan.

Cast

Soundtrack

References

External links
 

Films set in Punjab, India
Punjabi-language Indian films
2010s Punjabi-language films
Films based on Indian folklore